Maurice Tillette (29 December 1884 – 26 August 1973) was a French footballer. He competed in the men's tournament at the 1908 Summer Olympics.

References

External links
 

1884 births
1973 deaths
French footballers
France international footballers
Olympic footballers of France
Footballers at the 1908 Summer Olympics
Place of birth missing
Association football goalkeepers
US Boulogne players
People from Boulogne-sur-Mer
Sportspeople from Pas-de-Calais
Footballers from Hauts-de-France